Mustafa Cihad Baban (Cihad also spelled Cihat; 26 September 1911 – 28 September 1984) was a Turkish journalist, author, and a parliamentary deputy in the 1950s and 1960s.

Background
Baban was born in Istanbul, where he attended Galatasaray High School, and graduated from Istanbul University in 1934.

Career
As a journalist, Baban contributed to newspapers including Son Posta, Yeni Sabah, Cumhuriyet, and Tercüman, and he was one of the founders of the Turkish Journalists' Association in 1946. He also wrote a variety of books.

Baban was elected in the 1946 general election for the Democratic Party, representing Istanbul. He was re-elected in the 1950 general election and 1954 general election, representing Izmir Province until the 1957 elections, in which he was not elected.

He was a member of the constituent assembly which wrote the 1961 Constitution of Turkey, and was Minister of Tourism and Promotion (January to August 1961) in the 1960-1 post-coup government of Cemal Gürsel. In the October 1961 general election he was elected again for the Republican People's Party representing Istanbul, and in the 1965 general election representing Çanakkale. He later served as Minister of Culture in the 1980-3 post-coup government of Bülend Ulusu. He died in Ankara.

Books
 Hitler ve Nasyonel Sosyalizm (1933), 
 Yüzyılın Büyük Kavgası Çin-Rus Anlaşmazlığı (1968), 
 Adanauer (1968), 
 Hoşi-Minh (1968), 
 Politika Galerisi (1970)

References

1911 births
Galatasaray High School alumni
Istanbul University alumni
Istanbul University Faculty of Law alumni
Turkish journalists
Democrat Party (Turkey, 1946–1961) politicians
20th-century Turkish politicians
Republican People's Party (Turkey) politicians
Deputies of Istanbul
Deputies of Izmir
Deputies of Çanakkale
Government ministers of Turkey
1984 deaths
Members of the 44th government of Turkey
Members of the 25th government of Turkey
20th-century Turkish journalists
Cumhuriyet people